Band of Joy is English rock singer Robert Plant's ninth solo album and the first with his new band, the Band of Joy. It was released on 13 September 2010 in the UK and 14 September in the USA.

Background 
In addition to the song "Satan Your Kingdom Must Come Down", which is the opening theme for the Starz television series Boss, the credits of BBC One's Luther for an episode aired on 16 July 2013 and the season two finale of the Syfy series Defiance, the album is notable for the song "Monkey". The song, originally by the band Low, is slowed-down to a grinding, spooky Gothic Rock tempo and mood that is different from Low's version. It is arguably the least similar to other tracks on the album (except for Satan), which for the most part carry folk rock or progressive rock moods. Although it is not a staple at Plant's live performances, there have been instances where he has performed it.

The album debuted at #5 on the Billboard 200 chart and at #3 on the UK Albums Chart. The first single released from the album was "Angel Dance".

Track listing

Personnel 
 Robert Plant – lead vocals, backing vocals (1,2,3,5,11)
Band of Joy 
 Bekka Bramlett – backing vocals (1,2)
 Marco Giovino – drums, percussion, backing vocals (3)
 Patty Griffin – vocals, backing vocals (2,3,4,5,8,10,11)
 Byron House – bass guitar, double bass
 Buddy Miller – electric guitar, baritone guitar, 6-string bass guitar, mando guitar, backing vocals (2,3,6)
 Darrell Scott – acoustic guitar, mandolin, octave mandolin, banjos, accordion, pedal steel guitar & lap steel guitar, backing vocals (1,2,3,4,6,7,10,11)

Critical reaction 

Band of Joy was received positively. Metacritic's aggregate score for the album is 80 out of 100, indicating "generally favorable reviews". Rolling Stone, while only giving the album a three-and-a-half-star review, ranked it #8 on its list of the 30 Best Albums of 2010. Q Magazine in its January 2011 edition ranked Band of Joy as the second best album of 2010, stating that, "free from having to imitate his 20-year-old self in Zeppelin, the sexagenarian sings to his strengths here, with Miller and Griffin his not-so secret weapons on an album that pinwheels between gentlemanly country-blues (Cindy, I'll Marry You Some Day), spooky lo-fi (Silver Rider) and charming '60s pop (You Can't Buy My Love)."

Awards 

The album was nominated for two Grammy Awards, including Best Americana Album and the song "Silver Rider" for Best Solo Rock Vocal Performance. Frontman and vocalist Robert Plant was nominated for best British Male Solo Artist at the Brit Awards 2011.

Charts

Weekly charts

Year-end charts

Certifications

References 

2010 albums
Band of Joy albums
Covers albums
Decca Records albums
Rounder Records albums